"Tall, dark, and handsome" is a phrase that refers to an appealing man, often found in romantic fiction aimed at women.

History
The term came to prominent use in the early 1900s and was commonly used in Hollywood during the 1920s to describe Rudolph Valentino. As an idiom it is both lexically and sequentially fixed.

In the 2010s, Bollywood actors Ranveer Singh, Randeep Hooda, and Arjun Kapoor were described by the phrase in the Indian media.

Model David Gandy has often been called tall, dark and handsome in the media. The New Zealand Herald described further that "At 191cm, he's taller than most models and up close - with his dark, almost black hair and bronzed olive complexion - he's like a live version of Michelangelo's Statue of David."

Studies 
David Puts is an associate professor of anthropology at Pennsylvania State University who has studied the evolutionary bases of human sexuality. In 2017 he was asked if "tall, dark and handsome" is universally attractive in the human experience   and he stated that not enough cross-cultural work had been conducted to be very confident in the concept's scientific validity.

See also
 Average height around the world
 Bad boy archetype
 Physical attractiveness

References

Further reading
 
 
 
 
 
 
 

English-language idioms
Male beauty
Human height
Terms for men